Regnal numbers are ordinal numbers used to distinguish among persons with the same name who held the same office. Most importantly, they are used to distinguish monarchs. An ordinal is the number placed after a monarch's regnal name to differentiate between a number of kings, queens or princes reigning the same territory with the same regnal name.

It is common to start counting either since the beginning of the monarchy, or since the beginning of a particular line of state succession. For example, Boris III of Bulgaria and his son Simeon II were given their regnal numbers because the medieval rulers of the First and Second Bulgarian Empire were counted as well even if the present Bulgarian state dated only back to 1878 and were only distantly related to the previous Bulgarian states. On the other hand, the kings of England and kings of Great Britain and the United Kingdom are counted starting with the Norman Conquest. That is why the son of Henry III of England is counted as Edward I, even though there were three English monarchs named Edward before the Conquest (they were distinguished by epithets instead).

Sometimes legendary or fictional persons are included. For example, the Swedish kings Eric XIV (reigned 1560–68) and Charles IX (1604–11) took ordinals based on a fanciful 1544 history by Johannes Magnus, which invented six kings of each name before those accepted by later historians. A list of Swedish monarchs, represented on the map of the Estates of the Swedish Crown, produced by French engraver  (1673–1721) and published in Paris in 1719, starts with Canute I and shows Eric XIV and Charles IX as Eric IV and Charles II respectively; the only Charles holding his traditional ordinal in the list is Charles XII. Also, in the case of Emperor Menelik II of Ethiopia, he chose his regnal number with reference to a mythical ancestor and  first sovereign of his country (a supposed son of biblical King Solomon) to underline his legitimacy into the so-called Solomonic dynasty.

Examples of monarchical ordinals

Monarchs with the same given name are distinguished by their ordinals:
 Kings Umberto I and Umberto II of Italy
 Empresses Catherine I and Catherine II of Russia
 Princes Rainier II and Rainier III of Monaco
 Popes Benedict XV and Benedict XVI

Ordinals may also apply where a ruler of one realm and a ruler of that realm's successor state share the same name:
 Queens Elizabeth I of England and Elizabeth II of the United Kingdom.
 Kings Alfonso XI of Castile and Alfonso XII of Spain.
 Kings Victor Emmanuel I of Sardinia and Victor Emmanuel II of Italy

Double names 
Practice varies where monarchs go by two or more given names. For Swedish monarchs, the ordinal qualifies only the first name; for example, Gustav VI Adolf, known as "Gustav Adolf", was the sixth Gustav/Gustaf, but the third Gustav Adolf.  By contrast, the Kingdom of Prussia was ruled in turn by Friedrich I, Friedrich Wilhelm I, Friedrich II, and Friedrich Wilhelm II; and later by Wilhelm I.  Likewise Pope John Paul I, who chose his double name to honour predecessors John XXIII and Paul VI, and was succeeded by John Paul II.

Ordinals for non-reigning royalty 
In any case, it is usual to count only the monarchs or heads of the family, and to number them sequentially up to the end of the dynasty. A notable exception to this rule is the German House of Reuss. This family has the particularity that every male member during the last centuries was named Heinrich, and all of them, not only the head of the family, were numbered. While the members of the elder branch were numbered in order of birth until the extinction of the branch in 1927, the members of the younger line were (and still are) numbered in sequences that began and ended roughly as centuries began and ended. This explains why the current (since 2012) head of the Reuss family is called Heinrich XIV, his late father Heinrich IV and his sons Heinrich XXIX and Heinrich V.

It is rare, but some German princely families number all males whether head of the family or not; for example, Hans Heinrich XV von Hochberg was preceded as Prince of Pless by Hans Heinrich XI and succeeded by Hans Heinrich XVII; the ordinals XII, XIII, XIV, and XVI were borne by von Hochbergs who were not Prince of Pless. Similarly for the House of Reuss, where all men were numbered Heinrichs and some were reigning Princes of Reuss-Gera or Reuss-Greiz.

History
Almost all West European monarchs and popes after medieval times have used ordinals. Ordinals are also retrospectively applied to earlier monarchs in most works of reference, at least as far as they are not easy to distinguish from each other by any other systematical means. In several cases, various sorts of "semi-regnal" members of dynasties are also numeraled, to facilitate their individuality in works of reference – in cases such as co-regents, crown princes, succession-conveying consorts, prime ministers and deputy monarchs. In the first centuries after the Middle Ages, the use was sometimes sporadic, but became established by the 18th century. In the past couple of centuries, European monarchs without an official ordinal have been rarities.

As a rule of thumb, medieval European monarchs did not use ordinals at their own time, and those who used were rarities and even their use was sporadic. Ordinals for monarchs before the 13th century are anachronisms, as are also ordinals for almost all later medieval monarchs. Still, they are often used, because they are a practical way of distinguishing between different historical monarchs who had the same name.

Popes were apparently the first to assume official ordinals for their reigns, although this occurred only in the last centuries of the Middle Ages. It is clear, from renumberings of Popes John XV–XIX and Popes Stephen II–IX, that as of the 11th century the popes did not yet use established ordinals. The official, self-confirmed numbering of John XXI means that at latest from the 13th century the popes did take official ordinals in their accession.

Emperor Frederick II, king Charles II of Naples and king Premislas II of Poland evidently used ordinals sometimes during their reign, whereas most of their contemporary monarchs did not. In the 14th century, Emperor Charles IV sometimes used that ordinal. Presumably, use of the ordinal of king Frederick III of Sicily also is contemporaneous. The royal chroniclers of the Abbey of Saint-Denis were using ordinals to refer to the French kings as early as the thirteenth century with the practise entering common usage among royalty and the nobility by the late fourteenth century. The British tradition of consistently and prevalently numbering monarchs dates back to Henry VIII and Mary I; however, sporadic use occurred at least as early as the reign of Edward III.

The long history of the papacy has led to difficulties in some cases.  For example, Stephen was only pope for three days before dying of apoplexy, and was never consecrated. Because not all list-makers count him as having been pope (as Stephen II), there has been some confusion in regard to later popes who chose the name Stephen. Later Stephens are sometimes numbered with parentheses, e.g., his immediate successor (in name) is denoted either Stephen (II) III or Stephen III (II).  The church did consider Stephen II a pope until 1960, when he was removed from the list of popes in 1961. The history of the numbering of popes taking the regnal name "John" is even more convoluted, owing to the long history of popes taking the name (a common name, chosen frequently to honour the Apostle), bad record-keeping, and political confusion; among other results, the regnal name "John XX" is completely skipped under all reckonings.

Personal unions
In the case of personal unions, some monarchs have had more than one ordinal, because they had different ordinals in their different realms. For instance, Charles XV of Sweden was also king of Norway, but in Norway he went under the name Charles IV. The Swedish-Norwegian union was in force 1814–1905 and both realms had had kings called Charles before the union, but Sweden had had more kings by that name.

In the event of one kingdom achieving independence from another but retaining the same monarch, the monarch often retains the same number as was already used in the older realm. King Christian X of Denmark thus became King Christian X of Iceland when Iceland became an independent kingdom in personal union with Denmark in 1918. The same is true for Commonwealth realms, where the monarch retains the regnal number from the British line of monarchs (see below).

Ordinals and the British Acts of Union 1707

Beginning in 1603, when England and Scotland began to share a monarch but were still legally separate realms, their monarchs were numbered separately.  The king who began the personal union was James VI of Scotland who was also James I of England, and his name is often written (especially in Scotland) as James VI and I.  Similarly, his grandson is James VII and II.  Mary II's ordinal coincidentally relates to both her predecessors Mary I of England and Mary I of Scotland; her co-sovereign husband is William III and II (here the English number is first). Charles I and Charles II had a name not used in either country before 1603.

Acts of Union

After the realms were united with the Acts of Union 1707, separate numbers were not needed for the next five monarchs: Anne and the four Georges. However, when William IV acceded in 1830, he was not called William III in Scotland. (George Croly pointed out in 1830 the new king was William I, II, III, and IV: of Hanover, Ireland, Scotland, and England respectively.)  Nor were Edward VII and Edward VIII known as Edward I and Edward II (or possibly II and III, if one counts the disputed reign of Edward Balliol) of Scotland.  These kings all followed the numbering consistent with the English sequence of sovereigns (which, incidentally, was also the higher of the two numbers in all occurring cases).  This was not without controversy in Scotland, however; for example, Edward VII's regnal number was occasionally omitted in Scotland, even by the established Church of Scotland, in deference to protests that the previous Edwards were English kings who had "been excluded from Scotland by battle".

Current state

The issue arose again with the accession of Queen Elizabeth II, as Scotland had never before had a regnant Queen Elizabeth, the previous queen of that name having been queen of England only. Objections were raised, and sustained, to the use of the royal cypher EIIR anywhere in Scotland, resulting in several violent incidents, including the destruction of one of the first new EIIR pillar boxes in Scotland, at Leith in late 1952. Since that time, the cipher used in Scotland on all government and Crown property and street furniture has carried no lettering, but simply the Crown of Scotland from the Honours of Scotland. A court case, MacCormick v Lord Advocate, contesting the style "Elizabeth II" within Scotland, was decided in 1953 on the grounds that the numbering of monarchs was part of the royal prerogative, and that the plaintiffs had no title to sue the Crown.

To rationalise this usage, it was suggested by Winston Churchill, the Prime Minister of the day, that in future, the higher of the two numerals from the English and Scottish sequences would always be used. This had been the case de facto since the Acts of Union 1707; eight of the twelve monarchs since the Act had names never previously used in England or Scotland (Anne, six Georges, and Victoria), sidestepping the issue, and the English numbers for the remaining four monarchs' names (William, two Edwards, and Elizabeth) have consistently been higher and were used.

Ireland
As the Lordship of Ireland (1171–1542) and Kingdom of Ireland (1542-1800) were subordinate to the Kingdom of England, the English ordinals were used in Ireland even before the Acts of Union 1800. William III of England and William IV of the United Kingdom were still called "William III" and "William IV" in Ireland, even though neither William I or William II ruled any part of Ireland. Similarly, the various Kings Henry are numbered II–VIII as they are in England even though Henry I of England never ruled any part of Ireland. Elizabeth I of England is referred to in Irish regnal year legal citations as "Elizabeth" rather than "Elizabeth I" because Ireland became a republic before Elizabeth II became queen.

"The first"  

In some monarchies it is customary not to use an ordinal when there has been only one holder of that name. For example, Queen Victoria will not be called Victoria I until there is a Victoria II. This tradition is applied in the United Kingdom, Belgium, Luxembourg, Norway and the Netherlands. It was also applied in most of the former German monarchies and in Hungary. In Sweden, the practice is not consistent, as Sigismund and Adolf Frederick never have ordinals, whereas Frederick I often does.

Other monarchies assign ordinals to monarchs even if they are the only ones of their name. This is a more recent invention and appears to have been done for the first time when Francis I of France issued testoons (silver coins) bearing the legend FRANCISCVS I DE. GR. FRANCORV. REX. This currently is the regular practice in Spain and Monaco (at least for Prince Albert I, as Princess Louise Hippolyte, who reigned 150 years earlier, does not appear to have used an ordinal). It was also applied in Brazil, Greece, Italy, Mexico, Montenegro, Portugal (where Kings Joseph, Louis and Charles are usually referred to as "Joseph I", "Louis I" and "Charles I", although there haven't been any Joseph II, Louis II or Charles II yet, while Kings Denis, Edward, Sebastian and Henry are usually referred without the ordinal). The ordinal for King Juan Carlos I of Spain is used in both Spanish and English, but he is sometimes simply called King Juan Carlos of Spain in English. In Russia, use of "The First" ordinal started with Paul I of Russia. Before him, neither Anna of Russia nor Elizabeth of Russia had the "I" ordinal. In Ethiopia, Emperor Haile Selassie used the "I" ordinal (qädamawi), although previous Ethiopian monarchs did not use it, and they are not referred as "the first" unless there were successors of the same name.

The Catholic papacy used the ordinal I under Pope John Paul I, but early popes who are the only ones to have reigned under a certain name are not referred to as "the first" (for instance, Peter the Apostle; his immediate successor Pope Linus; Pope Anacletus, etc., are all referred to without an ordinal). The current Pope Francis has declined the use of an ordinal, while on the other hand his Orthodox counterpart Patriarch Bartholomew I of Constantinople is using one, as does Aram I, the catholicos of the Armenian Apostolic Church.

In Austria, Emperors Francis, Ferdinand, Francis Joseph and Charles all styled themselves as "the first" despite the fact that they were all the only Emperors of Austria with those names.  Three of those names were previously the names of Austrian Archdukes (the Archduchy of Austria was a state within the Holy Roman and Austrian Empires), making three of these emperors Francis II, Ferdinand V, and Charles IV in their capacity as Archdukes.  Francis Joseph was the first Austrian Archduke of that name.

The use of "The First" ordinal is also common to self-proclaimed ephemeral "kings" or "emperors", such as Napoleon I in France; Dessalines, Christophe and Soulouque in Haiti; Iturbide in Mexico; Zog in Albania; Bokassa in the Central African Empire; Skossyreff in Andorra; Theodore in Corsica; or Norton in San Francisco. In these cases they wanted to emphasize the change of regime they introduced or attempted to introduce.

Pretenders
It is traditional amongst monarchists to continue to number their pretenders, even though they have never reigned. Hence, a supporter of the late Comte de Paris would have referred to him as Henri VII, even though only four men named "Henri" have been King of France.

Non-consecutive ordinals may indicate dynastic claims for non-regnant monarchs. For example, after Louis XVI of France was executed during the French Revolution, legitimists consider him to have been succeeded by his young son, whom they called Louis XVII.  Although the child died in prison a few years later and never reigned, his uncle, who came to the French throne in the Bourbon Restoration, took the name Louis XVIII in acknowledgement of his dynasty's rights. Similarly, when Emperor Napoleon I's regime collapsed, he abdicated in favour of his four-year-old son, who was proclaimed Napoleon II.  The young emperor was deposed only weeks later by Napoleon's European rivals and was never recognized internationally; but when his first cousin Louis Napoleon Bonaparte proclaimed himself Emperor in 1852, he declared himself Napoleon III of France in recognition of his predecessor.

Jacobite usage 
Following the Glorious Revolution, a line of pretenders loyal to the dethroned James VII and II claimed the throne, declaring themselves to be James VIII and III, Charles III and Henry IX and I. This separate enumeration is mainly because of their separation from the actual succession before the 1707 Acts of Union, that joined the kingdoms together.

James VII's legitimate descendants however died out entirely in 1807 as the only ones besides the three pretenders were the Protestant Queens Mary II (who was childless) and Anne (whose children predeceased her) that they refused to recognize to begin with. Since William III and II had died in 1702 without issue, the only legitimate line descending from Charles I still alive was that of Henrietta Stuart, sister of James VII and II, and her daughter Anne Marie d'Orléans, Queen of Sardinia.

Anne Marie's descendant Francis, Duke of Bavaria (who is also a pretender to the Kingdom of Bavaria) has been the Jacobite heir since 1996. Although no Jacobite has actively claimed the throne since Henry Stuart, their supporters have still given them separate regnal numbers for both England and Scotland that they believe they "should have".

Queens consort

While reigning monarchs use ordinals, ordinals are not used for royal female consorts. So whereas King George V used an ordinal to distinguish him from other kings in the United Kingdoms called George, his wife, Queen Mary, had no ordinal.

The lack of an ordinal in the case of royal consorts complicates the recording of history, as there may be a number of consorts over time with the same name with no way to distinguish between them. For that reason, royal consorts are sometimes after their deaths recorded in history books and encyclopaedias through the use of their pre-marital name or, if from royalty or sovereign nobility, the name of the dynasty or the country. For example, Henry VIII of England's fifth wife, Catherine Howard (of noble but not sovereign ancestry), is known by her maiden surname, while George V's wife (a descendant of the sovereign ducal house of Württemburg) is commonly known as Mary of Teck (after her father's title), and Edward VII's wife (a daughter of the King of Denmark) is known as Alexandra of Denmark.

Kings consort

It is not usual to number male consorts of a Queen regnant, or even to consider them as 'kings', unless both of them are crowned: as it was the case of Mary II and William III of England, or of all male kings consort in medieval crusader Kingdom of Jerusalem and in medieval Spanish Kingdom of Navarre.

In the history of Spain the only king consort was Francisco de Asis de Borbón, husband of Isabella II, but he is not numbered at all and is never included in official regnal lists.

The kingdom of Portugal had the uncommon custom of not only recognizing the title of 'king', but also numbering a consort of a Queen regnant, but only if and when he fathers an heir apparent to her, and nevertheless they are also not included in official lists of Portuguese Chiefs of State. And so, the husband of Maria I is known as 'king consort Pedro III' until his death in 1786 before his wife; and also the husband of Maria II was titled 'King consort Fernando II' when their elder son, the future king Pedro V, was born in 1837, but this same title was retired from him when his queen wife died in 1853.

References

Monarchy
Titles
Numbers